The Kilodegree Extremely Little Telescope (or KELT) is an astronomical observation system formed by two robotic telescopes that are conducting a survey for transiting exoplanets around bright stars.  The project is jointly administered by members of Ohio State University Department of Astronomy, the Vanderbilt University Department of Physics and Astronomy Astronomy Group, the Lehigh University Department of Physics, and the South African Astronomical Observatory (SAAO).

KELT Telescopes 

KELT consists of two telescopes, KELT-North in Arizona in the United States, and KELT-South at the SAAO observing station near Sutherland, South Africa.

Each KELT telescope consists of a wide field (26 degrees by 26 degrees) medium format telephoto lens with a 4.2 cm aperture, mounted in front of a 4k x 4k Apogee CCD. Each can also be equipped with an alternative narrower field (10.8 degrees by 10.8 degrees) lens with a 7.1 cm aperture for a narrow angle campaign mode.  KELT-North uses an Apogee AP16E camera, while KELT South uses an Apogee U16M. The optical assemblies and cameras are mounted on Paramount ME mounts manufactured by Software Bisque.

KELT-North 

KELT-North is located at Winer Observatory in southeastern Arizona, about an hour's drive from Tucson.  KELT-North was installed at Winer in 2005, and operated continuously until 2022, with occasional interruptions for equipment failures and poor weather. KELT-North was decommissioned in 2022.

KELT-South 

KELT-South is located at the Sutherland astronomical observation station owned and operated by SAAO, about 370 kilometers (230 mi) North of Cape Town.  KELT-South was deployed at Sutherland in 2009.

Goals 

KELT is dedicated to discovering transiting exoplanets orbiting stars in the apparent magnitude of 8 < V < 10 magnitude.  This is the regime just fainter than the set of stars comprehensively surveyed for planets by the radial-velocity surveys, but brighter than those typically observed by most transit surveys.

Operations 

Both KELT telescopes operate by sequentially observing a series of predefined fields around the sky all night, every night when the weather is good. All recordings are made with 150-second exposures, optimized to observe stars in the target magnitude range of KELT.

Exoplanet discoveries 

KELT has made several exoplanet discoveries and at least one brown dwarf (which may be an extremely massive Super-Jupiter instead) to date. Yellow indicates it's contained in a binary system.

In addition, the survey has discovered brown dwarfs like KELT-1b.

References

External links 
 KELT-North survey website
 KELT-South survey website

Optical telescopes
Exoplanet search projects by small telescope